Pär Axel Sahlberg (born 1954) is a Swedish pastor, politician and former member of the Riksdag, the national legislature. A member of the Social Democratic Party, he represented Halland County between October 1994 and October 1998; and between April 1999 and October 2006. He was also a substitute member of the Riksdag twice: October 1998 (for Jörgen Andersson); and between October 1998 and March 1999 (for Ingegerd Sahlström). He is a Methodist pastor and was president of the International League of Religious Socialists.

References

1954 births
Living people
Members of the Riksdag 1994–1998
Members of the Riksdag 1998–2002
Members of the Riksdag 2002–2006
Members of the Riksdag from the Social Democrats
Methodist clergy in Sweden